Holly Cornford (born 22 September 1992) plays for the Great Britain women's national ice hockey team as defenseman. She is the captain of the Kingston Diamonds.

References

1992 births
Living people
British women's ice hockey defencemen